George Stormouth Henry Gibson (23 June 1885 – 31 December 1933) was an Australian rules footballer who played with Essendon and Richmond in the Victorian Football League (VFL).

Notes

External links 

George Gibson's profile at Australianfootball.com

1885 births
1933 deaths
Australian rules footballers from Western Australia
Essendon Football Club players
Richmond Football Club players
South Bunbury Football Club players